Bras d'Or Lake, the name of which means arms of gold or golden arms, is a saltwater lake on Cape Breton Island.

Bras d'Or can also refer to:

Places
 Bras d'Or, Nova Scotia, Canada; a community in Nova Scotia
 Little Bras d'Or, Nova Scotia, Canada; a community in Nova Scotia
 Big Bras d'Or, Nova Scotia, Canada; a community in Nova Scotia
 Bras d'Or (electoral district), in Nova Scotia, Canada
 Bras d'Or Lakes Scenic Drive, on Cape Breton, Nova Scotia, Canada

Vehicles
 Bras d'Or (train), the Halifax–Sydney passenger train
 , several Canadian warships
 HMCS Bras d'Or (auxiliary minesweeper) was an auxiliary minesweeper (1919-1940)
 , a British built experimental hydrofoil renamed 
 , a Canadian prototype hydrofoil of the Canadian Forces
 
 HMS Bras d'Or (R-103), a British built Royal Navy experimental hydrofoil entered into Royal Canadian Navy service

Other uses
The plural of "Bra d'Or" (Golden Bra), awards presented by the Playwrights Guild of Canada

See also